Lacul Fără Fund (also called Lacul Lemnelor) is a natural salt lake in the town of Ocna Sibiului, Sibiu County, Transylvania, Romania. It is one of the many lakes of the Ocna Sibiului mine, a large salt mine which has one of the largest salt reserves in Romania.

Name 
In Romanian, Lacul Fără Fund means The Bottomless Lake, which is an obvious reference to its high depth. The other name, Lacul Lemnelor means Lake of the wood.

History 
The lake was formed on the site of the Francisc Grube salt mine, which was abandoned in 1775 due to water infiltrations.

Information 
Surface: 
Maximum depth: 
Salinity: 96 g/L (at the surface), 318 g/L (at 6 m depth)

Lakes of the salt mine 
 Auster 
 Lake Avram Iancu-Ocniţa
 Balta cu Nămol 
 Brâncoveanu 
 Cloşca 
 Crişan
 Lacul Fără Fund 
 Gura Minei 
 Horea 
 Mâţelor 
 Negru
 Pânzelor 
 Rândunica 
 Verde (Freshwater lake)
 Vrăjitoarelor (Freshwater lake)

References 

 Lakes of Sibiu County